Sam Stern (born 29 August 1990) is a British celebrity chef and author. He has written six cookbooks Cooking Up A Storm – The Teen Survival Cookbook – translated into 14 languages – Real Food Real Fast; Get Cooking; Sam Stern's Student Cookbook; Eat Vegetarian all published by Walker Books, UK. And Virgin to Veteran – How to Get Cooking with Confidence – published by Quadrille.

Stern grew up as the youngest of five siblings in Yorkshire, England. Stern writes a regular blog, with cooking advice and recipes. He has written for First News, a children's newspaper. He wrote a monthly feature for 'Yorkshire Life Magazine' and has contributed to multiple of newspapers and magazines internationally. He has appeared on radio and TV in the US where he toured for three weeks.

References

External links
Official website

1990 births
Living people
British food writers
English chefs
Writers from Yorkshire